The Saint and Her Fool (German: Die Heilige und ihr Narr) is a 1935 German drama film directed by Hans Deppe and Paul May and starring Friedrich Ulmer, Lola Chlud and Hansi Knoteck.

The film's sets were designed by the art directors Artur Günther and Hans Kuhnert. It was shot at the Babelsberg Studios in Berlin and on location around Langenburg Castle and Oberstdorf in Bavaria.

It was one of three film adaptations of the novel of the same by title by Agnes Günther along with a 1928 German silent film and a 1957 Austrian film.

Cast
 Friedrich Ulmer as Georg, Fürst v. Brauneck  
 Lola Chlud as Charlotte, Fürstin v. Brauneck  
 Hansi Knoteck as Prinzessin Rosmarie  
 Hans Stüwe as Graf Harro Thorstein  
 Carl Ehrhardt-Hardt as Hans Friedrich, Musiker  
 F.W. Schröder-Schrom as Medizinalrat  
 Werner Pledath as Domprobst  
 Beppo Brem as Christoph  
 Hanni Weisse 
 Petra Unkel as Rosemarie als Kind 
 Lillian Berley 
 Jeanette Bethge 
 Erich Dunskus 
 William Huch 
 Georg Irmer as Diener  
 Hilde Muth 
 Erika Nymgau-Odemar as Wirtschafterin  
 Erika Raphael

References

Bibliography
 Goble, Alan. The Complete Index to Literary Sources in Film. Walter de Gruyter, 1999.

External links 
 

1935 films
1935 drama films
German drama films
Films of Nazi Germany
1930s German-language films
Films directed by Hans Deppe
Films directed by Paul May
Films based on German novels
Remakes of German films
Sound film remakes of silent films
UFA GmbH films
German black-and-white films
Films shot at Babelsberg Studios
1930s German films